Sciences Po Aix, also referred to as Institut d'Études Politiques (IEP) d'Aix-en-Provence, is a Grande École of political studies located in Aix-en-Provence, in the South of France. It is associated with Aix-Marseille University and is part of a network of ten Institut d'études politiques, known as IEP.

Sciences Po Aix is renowned on a national level for its law studies and defense & international security studies.

History
Sciences Po Aix was established in 1956. It is the heir of the École Libre des Sciences Politiques, created by Émile Boutmy in 1872, in response to a need for reform for the society and the republican state that has just been born, after the Franco-Prussian War of 1870.

In September 2007, Philippe Séguin (1943–2010), then President of the Court of Audit (in French Cour des comptes), was elected President of the Administration Council, succeeding Jean-Paul Proust (1940–2010), Minister of the Principality of Monaco. In July 2010, the former French minister of economy and current managing director of the International Monetary Fund (IMF), Christine Lagarde, member of the Administration Council since 2008 and 1977 graduate, was elected president.

Location
Sciences Po Aix is housed in a hôtel particulier, considered a Monument historique, designed by architect Georges Vallon in 1734. The building is located on the Place de l'université ("town square of the university"), opposite Cathédrale Saint-Sauveur on the rue Gaston de Saporta in Aix-en-Provence. This building previously housed the Faculty of Law of Aix-Marseille University.

Overview
Sciences Po institutes are Grandes Écoles, a French institution of higher education that is separate from, but parallel and connected to the main framework of the French public university system. Similar to the Ivy League in the United States, Oxbridge in the UK, and C9 League in China, Grandes Écoles are elite academic institutions that admit students through an extremely competitive process. The selection rates at these schools are frequently less than 10%. Alums go on to occupy elite positions within government, administration, and corporate firms in France.

Although these institutes are more expensive than public universities in France, Grandes Écoles typically have much smaller class sizes and student bodies, and many of their programs are taught in English. International internships, study abroad opportunities, and close ties with government and the corporate world are a hallmark of the Grandes Écoles. Many of the top ranked schools in Europe are members of the Conférence des Grandes Écoles (CGE), as are the Sciences Po institutions. Degrees from Sciences Po are accredited by the Conférence des Grandes Écoles and awarded by the Ministry of National Education (France).

The institute is modeled on the former École Libre des Sciences Politiques, and as such, Sciences Po specializes in political science, but uses an interdisciplinary approach to education that provides student generalists with the high level of grounding in skills that they need in History, Law, Economic Sciences, Sociology, Political science and International relations, enriched by specialization in years 4 and 5, after a 3rd year either on a professional placement in France or overseas or alternatively studying at a foreign university.   The third year of the curriculum is a year of mobility abroad, and students have the choice, they can spend two semesters in a foreign university, one semester in a university and one semester internship or they also have the opportunity to spend two semesters as a trainee. The academic course lasts five years, and it is a three-year undergraduate programme and a two-year graduate programme and the primary diploma is a master's degree.

Sciences Po Aix have concluded more than 130 exchange partnerships with different universities around the globe so that Sciences Po students can study in many countries during their third year. All continents of the world are represented, there are some partnerships in the United States (Wellesley College, Loyola University Chicago, Arizona State University, Florida International University...), in Canada (University of Montreal, University of Ottawa) in South America (University of Buenos Aires, Federal University of Rio de Janeiro, in Africa (Rhodes University), in Asia (Shanghai International Studies University, Hankuk University of Foreign Studies in Seoul, Waseda University in Tokyo), in Oceania (University of New South Wales in Sydney, University of Canterbury) and also in Europe (Free University of Berlin, LUISS University in Roma, Middlesex University in London...).

Directors
 1956-1974: Paul de Geouffre de la Pradelle
 1974-1979: Charles Cadoux
 1979-1984: Yves Daudet
 1984-1996: Jacques Bourdon
 1996-2006: Jean-Claude Ricci
 2006-2014: Christian Duval
 2015-: Rostane Mehdi

The directors of Sciences Po Aix are elected for a five-year term by the executive board of the school. Some members of this board have been elected such students, teachers and staff representatives. The executive board votes the pedagogical and administrative orientations and reforms proposed by the director, the budget of the school as well as the conventions with the foreign universities.

Notable alumni
Many top-tier politicians were students at Sciences Po Aix:

Jeremy Stine, American politician, current member of the Louisiana State Senate
Christine Lagarde, former managing director of the International Monetary Fund and current President of the European Central Bank
Philippe Séguin, French politician, former President of the National Assembly and President of the Cour des Comptes
Élisabeth Guigou, French politician, former Minister of European Affairs (1990 - 1993), of Justice (1997 - 2000) and of Social Affairs (2000-2002)
Roger Karoutchi, French politician
Federica Mogherini, current High representative of the Union for Foreign Affairs and Security Policy whilst enrolled at University of Rome La Sapienza, spent a year at the institute as Erasmus student
Chandrika Kumaratunga, former president of Sri Lanka
Brune Poirson, Secretary of State to the Ministry of Ecology
Patrick Mennucci, former member of the National Assembly
Patrick Ollier, former President of the National Assembly and Minister

In addition to the politicians, there are also some alumni of Sciences Po Aix that have occupied major positions in the culture, the state administration and also the business world.

 Bruno Étienne, anthropologist and sociologist, former professor at Sciences Po Aix
 José Frèches, French writer, former advisor of Jacques Chirac when he was Prime Minister
 Jean-Pierre Bernès, French sport agent
 Raphaël Liogier, French sociologist and philosopher, professor at Sciences Po Aix
 Pascal Lalle
 Fanny Ardant, French actress who won the César Award for Best Actress in 1997 for her performance in Pédale douce
 Yasmine Ryan (ca. 1983 – 2017), New Zealand journalist
 Efemia Chela, writer
 Julie Ruocco, writer

References

External links
 http://www.sciencespo-aix.fr  Official website of the IEP.
 http://www.monsciencespoaix.fr/  Student website run by the Arts Office: it includes forums, films, podcasts, pictures, etc.

 
Aix-en-Provence
Educational institutions established in 1956
Buildings and structures in Bouches-du-Rhône
Universities and colleges in Aix-en-Provence
1956 establishments in France